Route 325 is a  long north–south secondary highway in the southwest portion of New Brunswick, Canada.

The route's eastern terminus is in the community of Bertrand. The road travels south-west to the community of Haut-Bertrand. From there, the road continues to Trudel as Chemin Saint-Amateur at the intersection with Route 135. Route 325 is a connector from the Centre-Peninsule area around Paquetville and Saint-Isidore to the Caraquet region. Except for one small section at the western end of the route, its entire length is within Bertrand village limits and does not cross any major rivers.

History
October 2016 the route was extended continuing where the former Route 11 used to be.

Intersecting routes
New Brunswick Route 135
New Brunswick Route 145

See also

References

325
325
Caraquet